Samuel Ian "Sam" Ward (born 24 December 1990) is an English field hockey player who plays as a forward for Old Georgians and the England  and Great Britain national teams.

Club career
Ward plays club hockey in the Men's England Hockey League Premier Division for Old Georgians.

He has also played club hockey for Beeston (3 spells), Holcombe, Loughborough Students and Leicester.

International career
He competed for Great Britain at the 2016 Olympics, and for England in the 2014 Men's Hockey Champions Trophy. During the Olympic Qualifier against Malaysia, he was struck by the ball in the face and he lost some sight in his left eye. On 28 May 2021, he was selected in the England squad for the 2021 EuroHockey Championship.

References

External links

1990 births
Living people
English male field hockey players
Sportspeople from Leicester
Alumni of Loughborough University
Male field hockey forwards
Loughborough Students field hockey players
Field hockey players at the 2016 Summer Olympics
Field hockey players at the 2020 Summer Olympics
Olympic field hockey players of Great Britain
Commonwealth Games medallists in field hockey
Commonwealth Games bronze medallists for England
Holcombe Hockey Club players
Beeston Hockey Club players
Men's England Hockey League players
Field hockey players at the 2018 Commonwealth Games
2023 Men's FIH Hockey World Cup players
Medallists at the 2018 Commonwealth Games